Craufurd is a surname. Notable people with the surname include:

Craufurd baronets, baronetcies created for people with the surname Craufurd
Charles Craufurd GCB (1761–1821), Scottish soldier
Charles Craufurd Fraser VC KCB (1829–1895), British recipient of the Victoria Cross
Edward Henry John Craufurd (1816–1881), Scottish Radical politician
Howard Craufurd Elphinstone VC KCB CMG (1829–1890), recipient of the Victoria Cross
James Craufurd, Lord Ardmillan (1805–1876), Scottish judge
John Craufurd (MP, died 1814) (1742–1814), British politician
Quintin Craufurd (1743–1819), British author, born at Kilwinning
Robert Craufurd (1764–1812), Scottish soldier and Member of Parliament

See also
HMS General Craufurd, a First World War Royal Navy Lord Clive-class monitor